Frances Washington Delehanty (January 31, 1879 — January 8, 1977) was an American artist and illustrator, and a noted designer of bookplates, posters, and toy theatres. Later in life she helped to establish the Abbey of Regina Laudis on her property in Connecticut.

Early life and education
Frances Washington Delehanty was born in Washington, D.C. and raised in New York, the daughter of Daniel Delehanty and Fanny Madison Washington Delehanty. Her father was a Naval officer. She was descended from George Washington's brother Samuel Washington, through her maternal grandfather, editor Benjamin Franklin Washington. Delehanty attended the Academy of the Visitation, a Roman Catholic girls' school in Brooklyn, New York. 

As a young woman she traveled in Europe with photographer Gertrude Käsebier and her daughter Hermine. Delehanty is featured in one of Käsebier's better known photographs, titled "The Manger" (1899).

She also studied art at Pratt Institute. In 1915, Vanity Fair called her "the Queen of the Benedict Art-Village and absolute ruler of the Dutch Oven outdoor cafe", in an illustrated story about artists in Washington Square Park. During World War I she used her French skills as a nurse in France.

Career in art

Delehanty's illustrations appeared in national magazines including Everybody's Magazine Bookman magazine, and Harper's Weekly. She illustrated the books The Works of Jesus (1909) by Edna S. Little, Love in a Dutch Garden (1914) by Neith Boyce, More Fairytale Plays (1917) by Marguerite Merington, Gertrude Crownfield's Heralds of the King (1931), and Justine Ward's Sunday Mass (1932). She wrote and illustrated Canticle of the Three Children in the Fiery Furnace (1936), and They Go to Mass (1938). 

Delehanty was a prolific designer of bookplates. She designed posters for actress Minnie Maddern Fiske. She also made miniature cardboard "fairy playhouses" or toy theaters for children. "There is individuality abundantly manifest in all this remarkable girl does," marveled one newspaper profile in 1913. 

Delehanty showed four portraits at the annual art exhibition in Stockbridge, Massachusetts in 1922. She also had a group of "fashionable" portraits on exhibit in New York, and at the Gillespie Gallery in Pittsburgh, in 1927.

Abbey founding
Frances W. "Fanny" Delehanty lived in Bethlehem, Connecticut with fellow artist Lauren Ford (1891-1973), next door to Ford's adopted daughter, Dora Stone. In 1947, the pair helped to establish the Abbey of Regina Laudis near their farm in Connecticut. It was the first American monastery for cloistered Benedictine nuns. The founding of the abbey was the inspiration for a film, Come to the Stable (1949), written by Clare Booth Luce and starring Loretta Young and Celeste Holm; Elsa Lanchester played the eccentric, artistic, religious landowner character "Amelia Potts" (taking the place of both Ford and Delehanty).

Death
Delehanty died at home in Connecticut after a long illness in 1977, a few weeks before her 98th birthday.

References

External links

 Lew Jaffe, "Frances W. Delehanty" Confessions of a Bookplate Junkie (November 15, 2013). Blog post about Delehanty's bookplates, with many examples.
 An ex libris bookplate for Kate Cameron Simmons, by Frances W. Delehanty, in the Maria Gerard Messenger Collection of Women's Bookplates, at The Grolier Club.

1879 births
1977 deaths
Artists from Washington, D.C.
American women artists
American women in World War I
Pratt Institute alumni
People from Bethlehem, Connecticut
Washington family